Pauk is a town in Pauk Township, Pakokku District, Magway Region, in north-west Myanmar. It is the administrative center for Pauk Township. Pauk is located on the western bank of the Kyaw River just above its intersection with the Yaw River.

The current town was founded in 1840.  The local airport ICAO designation is VYPK (IATA code: PAU).

Notes

Further reading
 Winston, W. R. (1892) Four years in Upper Burma C.H. Kelly, London, pages 241-242,

External links
 "Pauk 
 Map — Satellite Im
 ages of Pauk" Maplandia

Township capitals of Myanmar
Populated places in Magway Region